Cardiac-enriched FHL2-interacting protein (CEFIP) is a protein encoded by the gene C10orf71 on chromosome 10 open reading frame 71. It is primarily understood that this gene is moderately expressed in muscle tissue and cardiac tissue.

Gene 

The cytogenic locus is found at 10q11.23. C10orf71 encodes 28294 base pairs (bp) within chromosome 10 at 49299193-49327487 bp. It is located on the plus strand and is flanked by several other genes.

mRNA 

The mRNA sequence of C10orf71 has 3 exons and 10 stop codons in the favorable splice form. The two alternative splice forms had 47 and 75 stop codons interspersed throughout the sequence so they were not utilized to obtain further sequence information. The main splice form that was analyzed had the ten stop codons interspersed throughout the 5' and 3' UTR, which was why this splice form was utilized to further analyze. The mRNA of the Homo sapiens ortholog of C10orf71was 5286 bp in length. 

The three alternative splice forms found of C10orf71 mRNA sequence and the locations stop codons, exons and the Kozak site found in Splice 1. Splice 1 was utilized to analyze and obtain information about as all of the stop codons found in this splice form were found in the 5' and 3' UTR regions of the sequence. There were three exons found in Splice 1 with a Kozak consensus sequence in the overall sequence as well.

Protein 

The mature Homo sapiens homolog of the CEFIP protein encoded by C10orf71 is 1435 amino acids (aa) in length and weighs approximately 156.5 kDa. This homolog has an isoelectric point of 5.94. The range of pH values from Homo sapiens to the latest ortholog analyzed, Rhincodon types, ranged from 5.94-6.93, with it gradually increasing as it went later in the divergence of the ortholog. 

Comparison of some of the orthologs analyzed when compared to Homo sapiens. The orthologs are arranged from species that are most closely related to the Homo sapiens ortholog to least closely related (top to bottom respectively).

Composition of protein 

CEFIP is predicted to be a non-transmembrane, soluble protein. It is predicted to be a nuclear protein with 91.3% confidence with it being fairly confident to be a nuclear protein throughout the orthologs. There was one positive charge cluster found in CEFIP protein sequence, that is located from amino acids 1165–1193. This cluster was moderately conserved throughout the orthologs analyzed. There was also a mixed charge cluster found in the Homo sapiens' sequence of this protein, located from amino acid 750–778, although this cluster was not highly conserved throughout the analyzed orthologs. There was one repeat sequence found as well, TASKPPA, located at amino acids 163-169 and 116–1172. This protein is Proline and Serine rich as well.

Domains and motifs 

One confirmed domain of unknown function (DUF) was found within the CEFIP protein sequence, DUF4585. DUF4585 is located on the Homo sapiens protein sequence from amino acid 311–334. DUF4585 was highly conserved throughout the orthologs that were analyzed. There was also a small vacuolar targeting motif (VAC) found within the analyzed protein sequence spanning amino acids 543–546.

Protein structure 

The mature CEFIP protein contains nuclear localization signals (NLS), pat4 (RKPK at aa 382, RPRK at aa 640, KRRK at aa 1190) and pat7 (PPWRKPK at aa 379 and PWRKPKT at aa 380) with an NLS score of 0.94. A secondary structure was constructed with a 6.1% confidence level.

Post-translational modifications 

There were seven GlcNAc O-glycosylation sites predicted within the protein sequence found at amino acids 116, 120, 139, 165, 468, 470, and 844. There were also several phosphorylation sites found interspersed throughout the sequence. One propeptide cleavage site was predicted at amino acid 38. There were three predicted sumoylation sites found at amino acids 599, 890, and 1176.

Expression 

The C10orf71 mRNA was found to be highly expressed in cardiac, muscle, and liver tissue (biology).

Regulation of expression 

There were 6 possible promoters found in the sequence. Promoter GXP_6729162 is 1403 bp in length. This promoter had several transcription factors of interest including those involved with myocytes.

Function 

There is little scientific information known about the function of CEFIP.

Interacting proteins 

There was a total of 25 proteins generated that were predicted to interact with CEFIP (Homo sapiens ortholog). Most of the interactions predicted were physical interactions with CEFIP. These interactions were discovered through a variety of mechanisms including, but not limited to: affinity chromatography, microarray analysis, and tandem mass spectrometry among others. Refer to table for details about the interacting proteins of CEFIP.

Interacting proteins, their function if known, and any tissues they have been found or predicted to be expressed in and any diseases they have been associated with.

Homologs

Paralogs 
There are currently no known paralogs to the C10orf71 gene.

Orthologs 

C10orf71 is known to have 68 orthologs in various species including primates (11 species), rodents (8 species), Laurasiatheria carnivores (14 species), Placental mammals (38 species), Sauropsida birds and reptiles (7 species), and fish (11 species). The highly conserved sequences are primarily from primates with the identity percentage of these species being >90%, whereas species such as reptiles, birds, and fish had an identity percentage ≤30%. Refer to table for additional information on dates of divergence, sequence length, and sequence identity and similarity for orthologs. C10orf71 is not present in prokaryotes, archaea, or fungi.

Ortholog table in descending order to latest ortholog diverged. This table compares the orthologs analyzed, their species names, common names, dates of divergence from Homo sapiens ortholog (MYA), length (aa), and percentage of similarity and identity.

Phylogeny 

A phylogenetic tree was constructed for the orthologs that were analyzed in comparison to Homo sapiens. With the species of latest divergence being Rhincodon types, or the whale shark.

Evolutionary rate 

C10orf71's rate of divergence was faster than that of fibrinogen or Cytochrome C.

Clinical significance 

There was a microarray experiment that also showed evidence that C10orf71's expression was lowered in skeletal muscle tissues that experienced sepsis. There was clinical significance found in the expression level of C10orf71 in an experiment looking at those with Myotonic dystrophy. One microarray analysis produced results that showed C10orf71's expression level decreased in those with prostate cancer as well.

References 

Genes on human chromosome 10